Airborne Express Flight 827 was a functional evaluation flight (FEF) of an Airborne Express Douglas DC-8-63F (registration N827AX) that had undergone a major modification. On December 22, 1996, during the test flight, the aircraft stalled and crashed, killing all six people on board. Accident investigators determined the cause of the accident was improper crew control inputs.

Background

Aircraft 
The aircraft involved was a Douglas DC-8-63 freighter registered as N827AX. The aircraft had been built in 1967 and was previously owned by KLM as a passenger aircraft (with registration PH-DEB) and then Capitol Air and National Airlines (registration N929R). In January 1986 the aircraft was converted into a freighter and delivered to Emery Worldwide (with the same registration). ABX Air (a subsidiary of Airborne Express) purchased the aircraft on June 17, 1996, more than six months before the accident. The aircraft was re-registered as N827AX. It underwent a major overhaul and was delivered to ABX Air on December 15 the same year, just a week before the accident. The aircraft was powered by four Pratt & Whitney JT3D-7 turbofan engines. At the time of the accident, the aircraft had flown 62,800 hours and nine minutes with 24,234 take off and landing cycles.

Overhaul 
The aircraft's overhaul was performed by the Triad International Maintenance Corporation (TIMCO). During the major overhaul, the aircraft received major avionic upgrades, including the installation of an electronic flight instrument system (EFIS). All four engines were removed. Two of them were overhauled and reinstalled on the aircraft, while the other two were completely replaced by different JT3D-7 engines from ABX Air. Hush kits were installed on all of the engines for noise reduction. The aircraft's stall warning system was tested and declared functional.

Crew 
Rather than a captain, a first officer and a flight engineer, Flight 827 was crewed by two captains (one flying, one not flying/monitoring), and a flight engineer. There were also three aircraft technicians on board.

The captain who was the pilot not flying/pilot monitoring (though acting as pilot in command (PIC)) was 48-year-old Garth Avery, who had worked for Airborne Express since 1988 and had 8,087 flight hours, including 869 hours on the DC-8. He was seated in the right seat. Avery was also a flight instructor with Airborne Express.

The captain who was the pilot flying (though acting as a co-pilot) was 37-year-old Keith Lemming, who had worked for Airborne Express since 1991 and had logged 8,426 flight hours, with 1,509 of them on the DC-8. He was seated in the left seat. Lemming had previously been a pilot for Trans World Airlines.

The flight engineer was 52-year-old Terry Waelti who, like captain Avery, had been with Airborne Express since 1988. Waelti had 7,928 flight hours, including 2,576 hours on the DC-8.

The three technicians were 48-year-old Edward Bruce Goettsch, 39-year-old Kenneth Athey, and 36-year-old Brian C. Scully. Goettsch and Athey both worked for Airborne Express, while Scully worked for TIMCO.

Accident 
Initially, Flight 827 had been scheduled to depart on December 16, but was delayed due to maintenance. An attempt on December 21, (operated by the same crew) was cut short due to a hydraulic problem. Flight 827 finally departed at 17:40 Eastern Standard Time at nighttime on December 22, 1996, after being delayed due to additional maintenance.

The aircraft was operating under instrument flight rules (IFR) and was to fly Northwest over New River Valley Airport's VOR, in Pulaski County, Virginia, then to Beckley, West Virginia, followed by other way points in Kentucky and Virginia, and then return to Greensboro. The flight was expected to last two hours.

Shortly after reaching , the aircraft experienced atmospheric icing, which was indicated when the cockpit voice recorder (CVR) recorded captain Lemming saying, "we're gettin' a little bit of ice here," and "probably get out of this," at 17:48:34 and 17:48:37 respectively.

Several landing gear, hydraulic, and engine tests were performed without incident. At 18:05, flight engineer Waelti said, "next thing is our stall series." The next item was a clean stall maneuver test. The crew would slow the aircraft down until the stick shaker activated, record the stall speed and that of the stick shaker activation, and then recover control of the aircraft. In other words, the flight crew would deliberately stall the aircraft.

At 18:07, engine power was increased. One minute later at 18:08, a buffeting sensation was experienced (which is considered normal during a stall test), followed by a rattling noise, and then flight engineer Waelti saying, "that's a stall right there… [unintelligible word] ain't no [stick] shaker." However, the stick shaker had failed to activate, as it was never heard on the CVR. The flight crew applied maximum engine power and pushed the aircraft's nose down in an attempt to get out of the stall. At 18:09, Air Traffic Control (ATC) asked the flight if they had initiated an emergency descent, with captain Avery replying, "yes sir." This was the last communication (and only distress call) from Flight 827.

At 18:09:35, the ground proximity warning system (GPWS) activated and sounded "terrain terrain, whoop whoop pull up." Three seconds later at 18:09:38, the aircraft crashed into a mountain at  mean sea level. The CVR recorded the sound of the impact. All six people on board died and the aircraft was destroyed.

Investigation 
The National Transportation Safety Board (NTSB) launched an investigation into the accident and arrived at the crash site the next day on December 23. Efforts to reach the accident site were initially hampered due to its remote location. Both flight recorders were recovered the same day.

According to the flight data recorder (FDR), the aircraft was in a nose-down wings-down position of 26 and 52 degrees, respectively, at impact.

The NTSB recreated the stall in a simulator. Despite deepening the stall, no unexpected nose-down pitches or lateral rolls occurred in the simulator. The decreasing airspeed caused the nose to pitch up.

In 1991, another Airborne Express DC-8 entered a real stall during an FEF, but the flight crew was able to recover and test continued with no further incidents. In the 1991 incident, the stick-shaker activated the same time the buffeting sensation occurred. A revised stall recovery procedure was issued to Airborne Express, which agreed to incorporate. However, the airline had only partially incorporated the procedure at the time of the Flight 827 accident.

Airborne Express' flight operation manual contained only a short section labeled "Test Flights" and the requirements for FEF's read:

...night test flights may be conducted only when the reported ceiling is 800 feet or above and the reported visibility is 2 miles or greater, and the weather forecast indicates that the ceiling and visibility will remain at or above those limits for the duration of the flight. The reported surface weather at Mercer County Airport in Bluefield stated that visibility was two miles.

Because of the aircraft experiencing icing (the NTSB could not determine the amount of ice that accumulated), it experienced a buffet  before the stall speed. The NTSB concluding that the icing, regardless of amount, (along with flight control rigging) did not contribute to the accident.

The flight crew were aware that they were in a stall, however, this was hampered due to the stick shaker failing to activate, and other factors caused the crew's situational awareness to be degraded. Despite checking the aircraft's maintenance records and reviewing Airborne Express' procedures for testing the stall warning system, the NTSB could not determine the cause for the stick shaker's failure. Due to the revised stall recovery procedure not having been fully implemented, captain Lemming made multiple incorrect flight control inputs by pulling up on the yoke, aggravating the situation further. These inputs did not meet Airborne Express FEF program guidelines. Captain Avery did not notice the incorrect flight control inputs made by captain Lemming, though he did attempt to instruct him to recover the airplane from the roll, but not how to recover from the stall. In addition he did not enhance his instructions or take over control of the aircraft himself. The NTSB was unable to determine the exact reasons for the breakdown in crew coordination, but stated that the most likely scenario was the fact that both pilots were captains, stating that captain Avery, as PIC should have monitored and challenged captain Lemming's actions. In addition, the flight crew's situational awareness that the aircraft was in a stall was short, as they were distracted by a compressor stall on the no. 2 engine and communications with ATC. The NTSB also stated that an angle of attack display on the flight deck could have helped the crew situational awareness. The fact that the crew lacked a visual horizon at nighttime was another factor due to the aircraft being in instrument meteorological conditions (IMC) from the time the stall maneuver was performed until impact.

Neither captain Avery nor captain Lemming had ever flown a DC-8 post modification on an FEF until December 21 (the initial FEF that was aborted), though the director of flight technical programs authorized Avery to serve as a pilot in command on post modification FEF's.

The Federal Aviation Administration (FAA) was inexperienced with Airborne Express' FEF program and was not firm enough with fully incorporating the revised stall procedure into Airborne Express's training manuals.

Final report 
The NTSB released the final report on July 15, 1997. The "probable cause" section stated the following:

The National Transportation Safety Board determines that the probable causes of this accident were the inappropriate control inputs applied by the flying pilot during a stall recovery attempt, the failure of the nonflying pilot-in-command to recognize, address, and correct these inappropriate control inputs, and the failure of ABX to establish a formal functional evaluation flight program that included adequate program guidelines, requirements and pilot training for performance of these flights. Contributing to the causes of the accident were the inoperative stick shaker stall warning system and the ABX DC-8 flight training simulator's inadequate fidelity in reproducing the airplane’s stall characteristics.The accident had been caused by pilot error due to captain Lemming's improper flight control inputs that captain Avery failed to notice. Another cause was Airborne Express failing to set up a proper program for test flights, resulting in inadequate training. The stick shaker failing to activate was also a contributing factor. Other contributing factors included the compressor stall on the no. 2 engine which distracted the flight crew, the flight crew's lack of a visual horizon at nighttime, and Airborne Express not requiring flight tests to be completed before nightfall. The NTSB also criticized the FAA for their poor oversight of the airline. Airborne Express agreed with the NTSB that the pilots used incorrect procedures, but disputed several other findings, citing that Avery did have prior experience controlling a DC-8 during a stall, and stated that the revised stall procedures were fully implemented at the time of the accident.

Aftermath 
The NTSB issued seven safety recommendations to the FAA. The NTSB also reiterated a previous recommendation regarding the angle of attack following the crash of American Airlines Flight 965 on December 20, 1995:Require that all transport-category aircraft present pilots with angle of attack information in a visual format, and that all air carriers train their pilots to use the information to obtain maximum possible climb performance.

Lynn Scully, the wife of Brian Scully, filed a lawsuit against Airborne Express for $20 million.

Brian Scully's sister, Maureen DeMarco, was killed in the crash of Comair Flight 3272 on January 9, 1997. Maureen was headed to Brian's funeral.

See also 

Air France Flight 447
Air Transport International Flight 782, another non-scheduled DC-8 flight that crashed one year previously
Colgan Air Flight 3407
West Caribbean Airways Flight 708
XL Airways Germany flight 888T, another flight test where the aircraft stalled and crashed

References

External links 

 Cockpit voice recorder transcript and accident summary

Aviation accidents and incidents in the United States in 1996
Airliner accidents and incidents in Virginia
Airliner accidents and incidents caused by pilot error
Accidents and incidents involving the Douglas DC-8
1996 in Virginia
December 1996 events in the United States
Airliner accidents and incidents caused by instrument failure